Blastobasis coffeaella is a moth in the  family Blastobasidae. It is found in Costa Rica and São Paulo, Brazil.

The length of the forewings is 6.2–7.9 mm. The forewings are greyish brown intermixed with greyish-brown scales tipped with pale greyish brown and few reddish-brown scales. The hindwings are translucent pale brown.

The larvae feed within beans of Coffea arabica.

References

Moths described in 1925
Blastobasis